is a district located in Kyoto Prefecture, Japan.

As of 2006, the district has an estimated population of 17,945 and a density of 59 persons per km2. The total area is 303.07 km2.

Towns and villages
Kyōtamba

Mergers
On October 11, 2005 the towns of Tanba, Mizuho and Wachi merged to form the new town of Kyōtamba.
On January 1, 2006 the towns of Hiyoshi, Sonobe and Yagi merged with the town of Miyama, from Kitakuwada District, to form the new city of Nantan.

Districts in Kyoto Prefecture